Sanjeev Shroff is an American bioengineer currently the Distinguished Professor of and Gerald E. McGinnis Chair in Bioengineering at University of Pittsburgh and an Elected Fellow of the American Physiological Society, American Institute for Medical and Biological Engineering and Biomedical Engineering Society.

References

Year of birth missing (living people)
Living people
University of Pittsburgh faculty
American bioengineers
Fellows of the American Institute for Medical and Biological Engineering
Fellows of the Biomedical Engineering Society